Rengoku II: The Stairway to Heaven is a fantasy action adventure game developed by Hudson Soft and published by Konami for Sony's PlayStation Portable. It was revealed on May 9, 2006 at the E3 convention.

Story
In the game, the player controls A.D.A.M., a battle android, as he fights his way up a tower with eight floors, the first seven named after the seven deadly sins. It offers a sad, twisted, love story instead of androids gaining their "self".

While the main character shares his name from the previous title (which can be changed), they are two different characters. The game also features over 300 weapons, downloadable maps, and items, as well as wireless multiplayer for up to four people.

Rengoku 2: The Stairway To Heaven is actually based from the poem/story The Divine Comedy by Dante Alighieri.

Reception
The game received a "Shame of the Month" award from Electronic Gaming Monthly, and got a 2 out of 5 on X-Play, saying that the only improvement was that not all of the rooms were the same as compared to the previous game, but still lacked anything to gain X-Play's praise since the problems from the first Rengoku still persisted.

References

External links
 Rengoku 2 at GameSpot

2006 video games
Action-adventure games
Fantasy video games
Hudson Soft games
Konami games
PlayStation Portable games
PlayStation Portable-only games
Seven deadly sins in popular culture
Video games developed in Japan